

2010
For the 2010 fixture, the field was doubled from three teams to six.  In the Eastern group, Russia topped the table by defeating Latvia and Ukraine.  Serbia took the Western group title by defeating both Germany and Czech Republic.

Eastern Group

Results

Standings

Western Group

Results

Standings

See also

References

External links

European Shield